The Chief Justice of Trinidad and Tobago is the highest judge of the Republic of Trinidad and Tobago and presides over its Supreme Court of Judicature. He is appointed by a common decision of the president, the prime minister and the leader of the main opposition party.

History

Tobago was claimed for England already by King James I in 1608, however in the following time saw varying rulers. In 1794, a planter was elected the first chief justice. The island was eventually ceded to the United Kingdom in 1814 at the Treaty of Paris and from 1833 it was assigned to the colony of the British Windward Islands.

In 1797 Trinidad, who had been previously controlled by the Spanish Crown, was captured by a fleet commanded by Sir Ralph Abercromby and thus came under British government. The post of a chief justice was established in March of the same year. Both islands, Trinidad and Tobago were incorporated into a single colony in 1888, which gained its independence in 1962.

Chief justices of Tobago

1794–1799: John Balfour (non-lawyer)
1799–1804: Robert Paterson   (non-lawyer)
1805–1828 ?: Elphinstone Pigott
1828–1832 No appointment
1832–1833: Richard Newton Bennett
1833–? G. Buchanan  - substitute for Robert Sympson Jameson
1840–1841: Robert Nicholas Fynn
1841–1861: Edward Dyer Sanderson
1862–1867: Henry Iles Woodcock
1868–1880: Joseph King Wattley, Jnr 
1880–1882: James Sherrard Armstrong
1882–1888: John Worrell Carrington

Chief Judges of Trinidad

1797–1808: John Nihell
1808–1811: George Smith
1814–1818: John Thomas Bigge
1818–1830: Ashton Warner

Chief Justices of Trinidad

1669–?: Juan Fermin de Huidobro 
1832–1849: George Scotland
1849–1869: William George Knox
1870–1885: Joseph Needham
1886–1888: Sir John Gorrie

Chief Justices of Trinidad and Tobago

1888–1892: Sir John Gorrie
1892–1899: John Tankerville Goldney
1900–1903: Sir William John Anderson
1903–1907: Ernest Augustus Northcote
1908–1924: Alfred van Waterschoodt Lucie-Smith
1924–1926: Sir Stanley Fisher (afterwards Chief Justice of Ceylon, 1926)
1927–1930: Sir Philip James Macdonell (afterwards Chief Justice of Ceylon, 1930)
1930–1937: Charles Frederic Belcher
1937–1943: Charles Cyril Gerahty
1943–1946: Henry William Butler Blackall
1946–1952: Cecil Furness-Smith
1952–1958: Joseph Leon Mathieu Perez
1958–1960: Stanley Eugene Gomes  (afterwards Chief Justice of the West Indies Federation, 1961)
1961–1962: Arthur Hugh McShine (acting) 
1962 - Trinidad and Tobago became the independent
1962–1968: Sir Hugh Olliviere Beresford Wooding
1969–1970: Arthur Hugh McShine
1970–1971: Clement Phillips (acting) 
1972–1983: Sir Isaac Hyatali
1976 - Trinidad and Tobago is declared as the Republic of Trinidad and Tobago
1983–1985: Cecil Kelsick
1985–1995: Clinton Bernard
1995–2002: Michael de la Bastide
2002–2008: Satnarine Sharma
2008–present: Ivor Archie

Notes

References

External links

 
Judiciary of Trinidad and Tobago
Trinidad
Trinidad and Tobago and the Commonwealth of Nations